The Heart of No Place is a 2009 independent film written and directed by Rika Ohara, based on reinterpretation of Yoko Ono's  life and work. Shot entirely on Digital 8 on location in Los Angeles, Berlin, Tokyo, Liverpool and Ho Chi Minh City, and with participation of many Los Angeles- and German artists and musicians,  the film won the Best Film (International) award at the London Independent Film Festival 2010. The film's soundtrack was composed by John Payne and features songs by Yoko Ono, Dieter Moebius, The Dark Bob and Anna Homler.

Plot
Rock widow Y. tries to come to terms with the death of her husband, the Artist Known as John. Sharing her grief is her assistant Charles, whose partner died of AIDS. When she meets Andrea, a young journalist with wild ideas about art and technology, she is awakened to parallels between her artwork, technology and economy. Daniel Mohn, the visionary founder and CEO of Monosoft, reminds her that the Cold War wasn’t won by missiles, but by artists like herself and her late husband.

Cast
 Rika Ohara as Y.
 John Payne as The Artist Known as John
 Charles Lane as The Assistant
 Sarah Holbert as Andrea
 Daniel Lynch Millner as Daniel Mohn
 Tress MacNeille as The Collector
 Carl Stone as Almost Himself
 Dieter Moebius and Michael Rother as themselves

Distribution
The film was first presented at the Créteil International Women's Film Festival in France on March 21, 2009. The picture screened at various film festivals, including Göteborg International Film Festival and London Independent Film Festival.

Exhibition dates
 Finland: May 15, 2010, Polar Film Festival
 France: March 21, 2009, Créteil International Women's Film Festival
 Hungary: September 24, 2010, Tisza Cinema Festival
 Italy: June 3, 2010, Festival Un Film per la Pace
 Portugal: November 13, 2009, Filmes Sobre Arte
 Romania: October 3, 2010, Romania International Film Festival
 Sweden: February 7, 2010, Göteborg International Film Festival
 Thailand: November 8, 2010 World Film Festival of Bangkok
 United Kingdom: April 17, 2010 London Independent Film Festival

Awards
Win
• London Independent Film Festival: Best Film, 2010.
In Competition
• Festival Internazionale Un Film perla Pace, Udine-Gorizia

References

External links
 
 

2009 films
2009 independent films
2000s English-language films
American independent films
2000s American films